The Algeti is a river in Kvemo Kartli, Georgia, spanning the municipalities of Tetritsqaro and Marneuli. Originating at Mount Kldekari, it flows into the deep rocky valley and then a plain before joining the river Kura as its right tributary. Colorful landscapes of the Algeti valley are protected as the Algeti National Park.

References 

Rivers of Georgia (country)
Geography of Kvemo Kartli